Windsor State Forest is a state forest in the town of Windsor in northwest Massachusetts.  Managed by the Massachusetts Department of Conservation and Recreation, the forest is noted for the Windsor Jambs waterfall, which cascades through a  gorge between  granite walls. Trails are available for hiking, mountain biking, horseback riding, and cross-country skiing. The park's former camping and swimming areas are currently closed but its day use area is slated to reopen in the spring of 2021.

References

External links
Windsor State Forest Department of Conservation and Recreation
Windsor State Forest Map Department of Conservation and Recreation

Massachusetts state forests
Protected areas of Berkshire County, Massachusetts
Protected areas established in 1925
1925 establishments in Massachusetts